The BUL M-5 is a M1911 clone pistol made by Israeli firearms manufacturer BUL Transmark. M-5s are made in "carry" models for personal defense and "competition" models for sporting use (particularly IPSC competitions).

Based on the M1911.45 ACP, this version is specifically designed to compensate for the 1911's heat absorption in high temperature environments with a polymer frame.

BUL also provided the polymer frame to other firearms manufacturers for production of Springfield Armory, Kimber Polymer and Charles Daly Polymer 1911 pistol lines.

External links
 http://www.bultransmark.com/ 

Semi-automatic pistols of Israel
9mm Parabellum semi-automatic pistols
.40 S&W semi-automatic pistols
.45 ACP semi-automatic pistols
1911 platform
.38 Super semi-automatic pistols
9×21mm IMI semi-automatic pistols